{{infobox book | 
| name          = The Book of the New Sun
| image         = booknewsun.jpg
| caption       = Front cover of the first one-volume edition (1998)
| author        = Gene Wolfe
| cover_artist  = Don Maitz
| country       = United Kingdom
| language      = English
| series        = Solar Cycle Book of the New Sun sub-series
| genre         = Science fiction
| publisher     = Simon & Schuster; Orb / Tor Books (first two-volume)
| pub_date      = 1980-1983 (four vols); 1994 (two)
| media_type    = Print (hardcover first; trade paperback first two-volume ed.)
| pages         = 950
| isbn          = 1568658079
| dewey         = 813/.54 20
| congress      = PS3573.O52 S53 1994
| oclc          = 30700568
| preceded_by   =
| followed_by   = The Urth of the New Sun}}The Book of the New Sun (1980–1983) is a four volume, science fantasy  novel written by the American author Gene Wolfe. It inaugurated the "Solar Cycle" that Wolfe continued by setting other works in the same universe (The Urth of the New Sun, The Book of the Long Sun series, and The Book of the Short Sun series).

Gene Wolfe had originally intended the story to be a 40,000-word novella called "The Feast of Saint Catherine", meant to be published in one of the Orbit anthologies, but during the writing, it continued to grow. Despite being published with a year between each book, all four books were written and completed during his free time without anyone's knowledge when he was still an editor of Plant Engineering, allowing him to write at his own pace and take his time.

The tetralogy chronicles the journey of Severian, a journeyman torturer who is disgraced and forced to wander. It is a first-person narrative, ostensibly translated by Wolfe into contemporary English, set in a distant future when the Sun has dimmed and Earth is cooler (a "Dying Earth" story). Severian lives in a nation called the Commonwealth, ruled by the Autarch, in the Southern Hemisphere. It is at war with Ascia, its totalitarian northern neighbor. 

In a 1998 poll of its subscribers, Locus magazine ranked the tetralogy number three among 36 all-time best fantasy novels before 1990.Locus subscribers voted only two Middle-earth novels by J. R. R. Tolkien ahead of Wolfe's New Sun, followed by Ursula K. Le Guin's Earthsea series. Third and fourth ranks were exchanged in the 1987 rendition of the poll, "All-Time Best Fantasy Novels", which considered as single entries Wolfe's The Shadow of the Torturer and Le Guin's A Wizard of Earthsea, the first volumes of New Sun and Earthsea.

Plot summary
The Shadow of the Torturer

Severian, an apprentice in the torturers' guild, barely survives a swim in the River Gyoll. On his way back to the Citadel (whose towers appear to be disused rockets), Severian and several other apprentices sneak into a Necropolis where Severian first encounters Vodalus, an aristocrat who is the Commonwealth's leading revolutionary. Vodalus, along with a noblewoman named Thea and a servant named Hildegrin, are robbing a grave. Vodalus and his companions are attacked by volunteer guards. Severian saves Vodalus's life, earning his trust and the reward of a single "gold" coin.

Later Severian rescues a fighting dog that has lost a leg and names him Triskele. When Triskele leaves, Severian tracks him to a place in the Citadel called the Atrium of Time, where he talks with a beautiful young woman, Valeria, but he does not get Triskele back.

In the torturers' tower, Severian falls in love with Thecla, a prisoner. She is Thea's half-sister and was imprisoned for helping her and Vodalus. Severian's attraction to her is hastened by his sexual initiation in a visit to a brothel at the guild's expense. The brothel is run by a eunuch and the prostitutes are clones of noblewomen; Severian chooses the clone of Thecla for his encounter.

Shortly after Severian is elevated to journeyman, Thecla is tortured with a machine that makes her uncontrollably suicidal so she will mutilate herself to death with her bare hands. Severian smuggles a knife into her cell. By thus letting her shorten the time of her suffering, he has broken his oath to the guild.

Severian expects to be tortured and executed. Instead, the head of the guild is uncharacteristically forgiving and dispatches him to Thrax, a distant city that needs an executioner, also giving him Terminus Est, a magnificent executioner's sword. Severian travels through the decaying city of Nessus. He meets the hulking Baldanders and his companion Dr. Talos, traveling as mountebanks, who invite Severian to join them in a play to be performed the same day. During breakfast, Dr. Talos recruits the waitress for his play with a promise to make her beautiful. Instead of participating, Severian parts with the group and stops at a rag shop to purchase a mantle to hide his guild uniform (a cloak and breeches of fuligin, "the hue that is darker than black", which inspires terror in common folk; when working he also wears a fuligin mask). The shop is owned by a twin brother and sister, and the brother immediately takes an interest in Terminus Est.  Severian refuses to sell the sword, shortly after which a masked and armored hipparch enters the shop and challenges Severian to a duel. Severian is forced to accept, and he goes with the sister, Agia, to secure an avern, a deadly plant that is used for dueling. He becomes strongly attracted to Agia and develops complicated feelings toward her. While on their way in a carriage, they race with the riders in a passing fiacre, and they crash into and destroy the altar of a female religious order, the Pelerines. The Pelerines accuse Agia of stealing a precious relic called the Claw of the Conciliator. After Agia is searched and released, she and Severian continue their journey to the Botanic Gardens, a large landmark of Nessus created by the mysterious Father Inire, right hand to the Autarch.

Inside the gardens, Severian falls into a lake used to inter the dead and is pulled out by a young woman named Dorcas who also seems to have come up from the lake. Dazed and confused, Dorcas follows Severian and Agia. Severian acquires the avern and the group proceeds to an inn near the dueling grounds.  While eating dinner, Severian receives a mysterious note intended for one of the women, warning her the other is dangerous, but it's not immediately clear which is which. He meets his challenger, and though stabbed by the avern he miraculously survives and finds that his challenger was Agia's brother. When Severian wakes again, he finds himself in a lazaret. After finding Dorcas, who he is falling in love with, and identifying himself as a torturer, he is requested to perform an execution. The prisoner turns out to be Agia's brother, who had provoked the duel expecting to win when he could claim Terminus Est. Severian executes the brother.

Severian and Dorcas return to their travels. In his belongings, Severian finds the Claw of the Conciliator, a large glowing gem. Apparently, Agia stole the Claw from the altar they destroyed and knowing that she would be searched, placed it in Severian's belongings. Eventually, Severian and Dorcas encounter Dr. Talos, Baldanders, and a beautiful woman named Jolenta. Severian takes part in the play they perform, and the next day the group sets out toward the great gate leading out of Nessus. There Severian befriends a man named Jonas who is obviously attracted to Jolenta. The first volume ends with a riot or disturbance at the gate, whose nature is not immediately clear, separating Severian and Jonas from the rest of the group.

The Claw of the Conciliator

The story continues shortly after the previous installment left off. Now in the nearby town of Saltus, Severian and Jonas delay their search for the others as Severian has been hired to practice his art of execution on two people. The first was a servant of Vodalus. As the man is dragged out of his home by a mob, Severian glimpses Agia amidst the crowd. Agia flees and Severian still attracted to and hoping to reconcile with her, follows, searching for her at the town fair. Unable to find her, he consults a green-skinned man whose master offers his services as an attraction, claiming he can answer any question. In answer to Severian's queries as to how he could know everything, the green man tells Severian he is from the future (where the sun is bright and people have photosynthetic organisms in their skin). The green man does not know where Agia can be found, but Severian takes pity on him and gives him a piece of his whetstone so that he can free himself by grinding through his chains. Severian returns to town and executes the two prisoners.

Eating dinner with his friend Jonas that evening, he finds a letter that seems to be from Thecla (but is actually from Agia) asking him to meet her at a nearby cave. In the cave, Severian barely escapes a group of man-ape miners. The light from the Claw stops the man-apes' attack, but it also seems to wake a gigantic unknown creature deep below in the cave, which is only heard and not seen. Severian escapes, only to be attacked by Agia and her assassins outside the cave. One of the attackers is killed by one of the man-apes, who had his hand cut off by Severian in the battle in the cave. The ape gestures its stump at Severian, wanting him to do something with it, but Severian does not know what. Severian prepares to behead Agia, but still unable to hate her, lets her go. He returns to Saltus, where he and Jonas are captured by Vodalus's rebels for executing one of its members.

Severian recalls to Vodalus that he saved his life some years past, so Vodalus allows Severian to enter his service. Severian and Jonas attend a midnight dinner with Vodalus, where they eat Thecla's roasted flesh, which, when combined with a substance from an alien creature called an alzabo, lets the eaters experience her memories. For Severian the experience is permanent; Thecla lives again in his mind. Given the task of delivering a message to a servant in the House Absolute, the Autarch's seat of power, Severian and Jonas set off to the north. They are attacked by a flying creature that feeds on the heat and life force of living beings and escapes only by tricking the creature into attacking and killing a nearby soldier instead. Severian feels guilty and, having come to suspect the Claw has healing powers, uses it to bring the soldier back to life. He and Jonas are captured by guards of the House Absolute and thrown into an antechamber where prisoners are held indefinitely. Severian's Claw heals a wound Jonas receives during the night they spend there; then the pair escapes some unknown horrible creature by using a pass-phrase drawn from Thecla's memories to open a secret door. As they walk the corridors of the House Absolute, Jonas is revealed to be a robot who once crash-landed on earth and has been repaired with human parts as prosthetics. He steps into a mirror and disappears, promising to return for Jolenta when he is healed. Severian is lost and eventually encounters Vodalus's spy, who is the androgynous brothel-keeper. After the androgyne opens and then closes a portal to someplace with a giant winged alien, Severian swears service to him. In the subsequent conversation, he realizes that the supposed spy is the Autarch.

Stumbling into the gardens of the House Absolute, Severian is reunited with Dorcas, Dr. Talos, and Baldanders, who are preparing to perform the play they performed in the first book. Severian participates again, but the play is cut short when Baldanders flies into a rage and attacks the audience, revealing that aliens are among them. Talos and Baldanders part ways with Severian and Dorcas at a crossroad, Severian heading toward Thrax, and the giant and his physician headed toward Lake Diuturna. Jolenta tries to have Talos take her with him, but he has no more use for her now that the plays are no longer necessary, and Severian takes her. As they head north, Jolenta is bitten by a "blood bat" and falls ill. Severian realizes that she had been scientifically altered by Dr. Talos to be gorgeous and desirable, but is quickly becoming sickly and unattractive. Soon the trio meets an old farmer who tells them they must pass through an enigmatic stone city to get to Thrax. In the ruined city, Severian sees a pair of witches initiate a dream-like event in which ghostly dancers of the stone town's past, led in a ritual by a teacher named Apu-Punchau, fill the area and fight with the witch's servant, who is Vodalus's lieutenant Hildegrin. The book ends with Dorcas and Severian emerging from a stupor in the stone town, Jolenta dead and revealed to be the waitress whom Dr. Talos had promised to make beautiful, and the witches and Hildegrin gone.

The Sword of the Lictor

Severian takes up his position as the Lictor of the city of Thrax. His lover Dorcas falls into depression, in part because of her position as the partner of a reviled and feared figure in a strange city. She is also becoming increasingly upset by her inability to remember her past and convinced that she must unravel its secrets, however disturbing they may turn out to be.

After escaping an exotic creature that incinerates things, which seems to have come to Thrax to find him, Severian again shows mercy to a woman he had had sex with—she was to be executed for adultery—and must flee the city. He journeys alone into the mountains in search of the Pelerines so that he can return the Claw of the Conciliator.

On the road, he battles Agia and an alzabo, a beast that acquires the memories of those it eats, as well as a gang of men who have opted to become like animals. He takes a boy also named Severian, whose family was killed by the alzabo, into his care. They encounter a village of men who claim to be sorcerers and possess more power than Severian at first believes, but they escape amidst the threat of yet another dangerous creature set upon his trail. While exploring an ancient mountain stronghold in search of sustenance or something of value, Severian and little Severian climb to a gold ring on the finger of a monolithic statue carved into the mountainside. When little Severian touches the ring he is blasted by heat and immediately perishes. On his way back down, a suicidal Severian inadvertently revives a monarch from the past, Typhon, who was in suspended animation. Typhon tries to dominate Severian with physical threats, psychological manipulation, and something like hypnosis, but Severian finds a way to kill him.

Continuing his journey to the great Lake Diuturna, Severian is drawn into a local conflict on the side of a group of islanders being enslaved. He discovers that his old companions Dr. Talos and Baldanders are the oppressors. Severian makes his way through their lakeside castle, discovering that Baldanders is an inventor and scientist who conducts experiments on people, and in fact created his own homunculus in the form of Dr. Talos.  Severian encounters the otherworldly hierodules within, who unexpectedly prostrate themselves in front of him. Severian then battles the giant Baldanders. He barely survives, while Baldanders vanishes in the lake. Severian's sword is destroyed in the battle, as well as the Claw. Down at the shore, he finds a curved thorn that he believes is the true claw that was set in the now-shattered stone.

In the wake of this battle, Severian seeks to digest a series of revelations: about the nature of Baldanders, the nature of the aliens (including Father Inire and the older witch in the stone town) who manipulate events on Urth and profess to be his friends and the nature of the Claw he carried for so long. As he does so, he finds himself approaching the edge of the war in the North.

The Citadel of the Autarch

Wandering around, Severian happens upon a dead soldier, whom he revives with the Claw, and they make their way to the Pelerines' camp.  In the camp, Severian suffers a fever and is treated along with people injured in the war.  While recovering, Severian judges a story-telling contest held by fellow patients. He returns the Claw by putting it on an altar.  A leader of the Pelerines tasks him to bring a friend of theirs in the mountains away from the danger of the war to the safety of the camp. The man, a time traveler from a future where the world is covered in ice, refuses to come with Severian, and when Severian leads him away by force, the man disappears, as he does not belong in Severian's time. Upon returning to the camp, Severian discovers it has been attacked and abandoned.  He soon finds the new camp, where most of those he met during his stay are dead or dying.

Severian is drawn into the war against Ascia. He nearly perishes in battle but is rescued by the Autarch. Severian is nursed back to health and converses with the Autarch about his role in the Commonwealth. Taking a flier over the war zone, they are shot down. The Autarch, dying, tells Severian to drink the contents of a vial around the Autarch's neck and eat his brain, as Severian is to be the next Autarch. Severian does so, and since the vial contained the alzabo drug or something similar, he acquires hundreds of consciousnesses that the Autarch had through the same process.

Before the Autarch died, he sent a message to Vodalus that the Autarch was aboard the flier. Thea and a group of Vodalus's men descend on the crash site and rescue Severian from their allies the Ascians. Severian is held prisoner and is visited by Agia in company with a former spacefarer who calls from other planets the creatures that have been attacking Severian. Agia attempts to kill Severian again, but he survives and is rescued by the green time traveler whom he rescued in The Claw of the Conciliator. The green man opens a passage through time in which Severian is visited by an alien who takes the form of Master Malrubius, a torturer who had died in Severian's boyhood, accompanied by the dog Triskele. "Malrubius" tells him that he must one day face a challenge that will either create a New Sun and allow humanity to return to the stars if he succeeds, or strip him of his manhood, leaving him unable to produce an heir, if he fails. Severian realizes that the last Autarch must have failed and thus become an androgyne.

After the meeting, Severian is left on a beach where many wild rose bushes are in bloom. He is pricked by a thorn and realizes that it is identical to the Claw, even to glowing. Seeing that and countless identical Claws on other bushes leads him to a religious experience. He also ponders the meaning of the Claw, higher beings such as the alien who appeared as Malrubius, time travel, and the New Sun. In an interlude at the time of writing the book, he says that he is on his way to the test.

Severian makes his way back to Nessus aboard a ship whose crewmen revere him on sight. In a long-abandoned part of Nessus, he finds Dorcas in her old house but leaves without making himself known to her. He visits other people of his past, assumes the role of Autarch, and suspends the practice of torture. Finding the gold coin Vodalus had given him, he realizes it was counterfeit. He returns to the waiter who slipped him the note in The Shadow of the Torturer. The note was meant for Dorcas, who reminded the waiter of his mother. A picture of Dorcas in a locket around the waiter's neck confirms this suspicion. It is implied that the waiter is Severian's father, making Dorcas his grandmother. Dorcas had died long before, and though Severian did not yet know he had the Claw, it brought her back to life in the lake.

The book ends with Severian exploring the Citadel and retracing Triskele's steps through an underground building. He follows his own tracks, returning to the Atrium of Time and Valeria.

Major themes
Severian as a Christ figure
Severian, the main character and narrator of the series, can be interpreted as a Christ figure. His life has many parallels to the life of Jesus, and Gene Wolfe, a Catholic, has explained that he deliberately mirrored Jesus in Severian. He compares Severian's profession as a torturer to Jesus's profession as a carpenter in The Castle of the Otter:
Severian's life parallels Jesus' occasionally, with his descent into the cave of the man-apes being a Harrowing of Hell scene, his resurrection of Dorcas being a Lazarus of Bethany scene, and his friendship with Jonas reflecting Ahasuerus. Jonas has traveled the world looking to reconnect with the Hierodules, "tinkers with clumsy mechanisms", and is redeemed from wandering exile after befriending Severian. In this respect, he represents the wandering Jew. Severian also suffers from occasional seemingly random bleeding from his forehead, as if from a crown of thorns. Also mirroring the crown of thorns, the Claw of the Conciliator, a thorn that causes Severian to shed blood, becomes a religious relic due to its relation to Severian. Terminus Est represents his crucifix, with Severian describing his sword in Urth of the New Sun as a "dark cross upon my shoulder." In the following volume, The Urth of the New Sun, Severian is resurrected as well, escaping to a Heaven-like plane of existence where an angel resides and then emerging from a stone tomb, as Jesus rose from his stone tomb.

However, Wolfe said in an interview, "I don't think of Severian as being a Christ figure; I think of Severian as being a Christian figure. He is a man who has been born into a very perverse background, who is gradually trying to become better."

Related works
During the years when The Book of the New Sun was published, Wolfe published two stories from it separately: "Foila's Story: The Armiger's Daughter" (one of the entries in the story-telling contest in the Pelerines' hospital) and "The Tale of the Student and his Son" (one of the two stories that Severian reproduces from a book he obtained for Thecla when she was imprisoned).

Shortly after The Citadel of the Autarch, Wolfe published The Castle of the Otter, a book of essays about The Book of the New Sun containing a few fictional elements, such as jokes told by some of the characters.

After the original four-volume novel, Wolfe wrote a novel often called a coda, The Urth of the New Sun (1987). He also wrote three short stories, "The Map", "The Cat", and "Empires of Foliage and Flower", that are closely related to The Book of the New Sun.

Later he wrote two-book series that are set in Severian's universe. The Internet Speculative Fiction Database catalogs it all as the "Solar Cycle", comprising the short works and three sub-series. The two later subseries are The Book of the Long Sun (1993–1996, four volumes) and The Book of the Short Sun (1999–2001, three volumes). Two of the Long Sun books were nominated for Nebula Awards.

Place within the genreThe Book of the New Sun belongs to the Dying Earth subgenre of speculative fiction. Peter Wright calls the series an "apotheosis" of traditional Dying Earth elements and themes, and Douglas Barbour suggests that the book is a foundational mosaic of that literary heritage:  Traces of this literary tradition can be found throughout the book. In The Sword of the Lictor, Cyriaca (the woman whom Severian spares in Thrax) tells Severian a legend about an automated city, with rebirth as a central theme. This mirrors John W. Campbell's Twilight, where sentient machines remove the need for human labor. Wolfe himself said that when he was a teenager Twilight had a great effect on his writing, and this homage to that story is not just a passing reference, but an allusion to a literary predecessor. Later in the story, Wolfe alludes to The Time Machine, with the scene where Severian meets the glowing man-apes mirroring the Time Traveler's confrontation with the Morlocks. In both stories, the protagonist holds up a light to awe the cave peoples, but in the Book of the New Sun Severian relates to the humanity of the man-apes with the glowing Claw of the Conciliator, while in The Time Machine the Time Traveler intimidates the Morlocks with his fire.

Publication history

The tetralogy was first published in English in the United Kingdom by Sidgwick & Jackson from 1980 to 1983, and the coda published in 1987, with second publications for each book occurring approximately a year after the first. Don Maitz illustrated the cover of the first publication, and Bruce Pennington illustrated the second cover. The series was also published in two volumes, named Shadow and Claw and Sword and Citadel, both published in 1994 by Orb Publications.

It was published as a single volume titled The Book of the New Sun in 1998 by Science Fiction Book Club and again in 2007 under the title Severian of the Guild, published by Orion Publishing Group.

Each book has been separately translated into Spanish, French, German, Dutch, and Japanese.

The Japanese printings of the tetralogy and coda were illustrated by Yoshitaka Amano.

Awards and nominations
Each of the four original volumes won at least one major fantasy or science fiction award as the year's "Best Novel" as shown by the table below. The tetralogy was not considered as a whole for any of the annual literary awards compiled by the Internet Speculative Fiction Database (ISFDB).

Language
Vocabulary
Gene Wolfe uses a variety of archaic and obscure terms throughout the series and in the appendix of The Shadow of the Torturer'' he explains his fictitious method:

Wolfe admitted, however, that some mistakes may have been made in spelling or exact meaning. His unusual words often come from an English–Latin dictionary or an English–Greek dictionary, where he finds roots of words to use.

Wolfe stated that he uses strange and arcane words because he "thought they were the best for the story [he] was trying to tell." Language is Wolfe's medium as a writer, and he wishes to "press against the limits of prose." Wolfe's deliberate use of exotic words is meant to manipulate the reader and force upon them a certain visualization of the story, but he does not mean to confuse the reader. He compares the narrator, Severian, and the reader to an English-speaking person and a German-speaking person building a boat:

Two examples of the arcane words Wolfe uses are "Ascian" and "Hydrargyrum". Ascian, despite its similarity to "Asian", is derived from a Latin word meaning "without shadow", as the Ascians are tropic dwellers who have no shadow at noon. Hydrargyrum, the fluid contained in Severian's sword Terminus Est, is derived from the Ancient Greek "ὕδωρ", meaning water, and "ἄργυρος", meaning silver, as hydrargyrum is liquid mercury.

Ascian language

The Ascian language further expounds on the idea that word choice alters the thinking of people, as the Ascian language is simply a set of quotations from government propaganda called "Correct Thought". In order to communicate, Ascians must memorize many quotations and learn to interpret others' use of them. This government regulation of language is intended to directly regulate the thought of Ascians. However, it is illustrated in the novels that the human capacity to adapt language to its own immediate needs and deploy it in unintended or unforeseen ways allows the Ascians to convey meanings outside of or even contradictory to those intended by the creators of "Correct Thought."

See also

 Bildungsroman

Notes

References

External links

 "Mapping a Masterwork: A Critical Review of Gene Wolfe's The Book of the New Sun" -(Peter Wright)
 "What Gene Wolfe Expects of His Readers: The Urth of the New Sun as an Answer to Mysteries in The Book of the New Sun", by Michael Andre-Driussi
 
 guardian.co.uk

1980s fantasy novels
1980s science fiction novels
Tetralogies
Dying Earth (genre)
High fantasy novels
Literary tetralogies
Novels about religion
Novels by Gene Wolfe
Picaresque novels
Science fantasy
Science fantasy novels
Simon & Schuster books
Fiction about the Sun
The Book of The New Sun